The Suez Canal is an artificial sea-level waterway in Egypt, connecting the Mediterranean Sea to the Red Sea through the Isthmus of Suez and dividing Africa and Asia.

In 1858, Ferdinand de Lesseps formed the Suez Canal Company for the express purpose of building the canal. Construction of the canal lasted from 1859 to 1869. The canal officially opened on 17 November 1869. The canal extends from the northern terminus of Port Said to the southern terminus of Port Tewfik at the city of Suez. In 2021, more than 20,600 vessels traversed the canal (an average of 56 per day).

The original canal featured a single-lane waterway with passing locations in the Ballah Bypass and the Great Bitter Lake. It contained, according to Alois Negrelli's plans, no lock systems, with seawater flowing freely through it. In general, the water in the canal north of the Bitter Lakes flows north in winter and south in summer. South of the lakes, the current changes with the tide at Suez.

The canal was the property of the Egyptian government, but European shareholders, mostly British and French, owned the concessionary company which operated it until July 1956, when President Gamal Abdel Nasser nationalised it—an event which led to the Suez Crisis of October–November 1956. The canal is operated and maintained by the state-owned Suez Canal Authority (SCA) of Egypt. Under the Convention of Constantinople, it may be used "in time of war as in time of peace, by every vessel of commerce or of war, without distinction of flag." Nevertheless, the canal has played an important military strategic role as a naval short-cut and choke point. Navies with coastlines and bases on both the Mediterranean Sea and the Red Sea (Egypt and Israel) have a particular interest in the Suez Canal. After Egypt closed the Suez Canal at the beginning of the Six-Day War on 5 June 1967, the canal remained closed for precisely eight years, reopening on 5 June 1975.

The expansion intended to nearly double the capacity of the Suez Canal, from 49 to 97 ships per day. At a cost of LE 59.4 billion(US$9 billion), this project was funded with interest bearing investment certificates issued exclusively to Egyptian entities and individuals.

The Suez Canal Authority officially opened the new side channel in 2016. This side channel, at the northern side of the east extension of the Suez Canal, serves the East Terminal for berthing and unberthing vessels from the terminal. As the East Container Terminal is located on the Canal itself, before the construction of the new side channel it was not possible to berth or unberth vessels at the terminal while a convoy was running.

Precursors 

Ancient west–east canals were built to facilitate travel from the Nile to the Red Sea. One smaller canal is believed to have been constructed under the auspices of Senusret II or Ramesses II. Another canal, probably incorporating a portion of the first, was constructed under the reign of Necho II, but the only fully functional canal was engineered and completed by Darius I.

Second millennium BC 
James Henry Breasted attributes the earliest known attempt to construct a canal to the first cataract, near Aswan, to the Sixth Dynasty of Egypt and its completion to Senusret III of the Twelfth Dynasty of Egypt.

The legendary Sesostris (likely either Pharaoh Senusret II or Senusret III of the Twelfth Dynasty of Egypt) may have constructed the ancient canal, the Canal of the Pharaohs, joining the Nile with the Red Sea (1897–1839 BC), when an irrigation channel was constructed around 1848 BC that was navigable during the flood season, leading into a dry river valley east of the Nile River Delta named Wadi Tumilat. (It is said that in ancient times the Red Sea reached northward to the Bitter Lakes and Lake Timsah.)

In his Meteorology, Aristotle (384–322 BC) wrote:
One of their kings tried to make a canal to it (for it would have been of no little advantage to them for the whole region to have become navigable; Sesostris is said to have been the first of the ancient kings to try), but he found that the sea was higher than the land. So he first, and Darius afterwards, stopped making the canal, lest the sea should mix with the river water and spoil it.

Strabo wrote that Sesostris started to build a canal, and Pliny the Elder (AD 23/24–79)wrote:

165.

In the 20th century, the northward extension of the later Darius I canal was discovered, extending from Lake Timsah to the Ballah Lakes. This was dated to the Middle Kingdom of Egypt by extrapolating the dates of ancient sites along its course.

The reliefs of the Punt expedition under Hatshepsut, 1470 BC, depict seagoing vessels carrying the expeditionary force returning from Punt. This suggests that a navigable link existed between the Red Sea and the Nile. Recent excavations in Wadi Gawasis may indicate that Egypt's maritime trade started from the Red Sea and did not require a canal. Evidence seems to indicate its existence by the 13th century BC during the time of Ramesses II.

Canals dug by Necho, Darius I and Ptolemy 
Remnants of an ancient west–east canal through the ancient Egyptian cities of Bubastis, Pi-Ramesses, and Pithom were discovered by Napoleon Bonaparte and his engineers and cartographers in 1799.

According to the Histories of the Greek historian Herodotus, about 600 BC, Necho II undertook to dig a west–east canal through the Wadi Tumilat between Bubastis and Heroopolis, and perhaps continued it to the Heroopolite Gulf and the Red Sea. Regardless, Necho is reported as having never completed his project.

Herodotus was told that 120,000 men perished in this undertaking, but this figure is doubtless exaggerated. The length that Herodotus tells, of over 1000 stadia (i.e., over ), must be understood to include the entire distance between the Nile and the Red Sea at that time.

With Necho's death, work was discontinued. Herodotus tells that the reason the project was abandoned was because of a warning received from an oracle that others would benefit from its successful completion. Necho's war with Nebuchadnezzar II most probably prevented the canal's continuation.

Necho's project was completed by Darius I of Persia, who ruled over Ancient Egypt after it had been conquered by his predecessor Cambyses II. It may be that by Darius's time a natural waterway passage which had existed between the Heroopolite Gulf and the Red Sea in the vicinity of the Egyptian town of Shaluf (alt. Chalouf or Shaloof), located just south of the Great Bitter Lake, had become so blocked with silt that Darius needed to clear it out so as to allow navigation once again. According to Herodotus, Darius's canal was wide enough that two triremes could pass each other with oars extended, and required four days to traverse. Darius commemorated his achievement with a number of granite stelae that he set up on the Nile bank, including one near Kabret, and a further one a few kilometres north of Suez. Darius the Great's Suez Inscriptions read:

The canal left the Nile at Bubastis. An inscription on a pillar at Pithom records that in 270 or 269 BCE, it was again reopened, by Ptolemy II Philadelphus. In Arsinoe, Ptolemy constructed a navigable lock, with sluices, at the Heroopolite Gulf of the Red Sea, which allowed the passage of vessels but prevented salt water from the Red Sea from mingling with the fresh water in the canal.

In the second half of the 19th century, French cartographers discovered the remnants of an ancient north–south canal past the east side of Lake Timsah and ending near the north end of the Great Bitter Lake. This proved to be the canal made by Darius I, as his stele commemorating its construction was found at the site. (This ancient, second canal may have followed a course along the shoreline of the Red Sea when it once extended north to Lake Timsah.)

Receding Red Sea and the dwindling Nile 
The Red Sea is believed by some historians to have gradually receded over the centuries, its coastline slowly moving southward away from Lake Timsah and the Great Bitter Lake. Coupled with persistent accumulations of Nile silt, maintenance and repair of Ptolemy's canal became increasingly cumbersome over each passing century.

Two hundred years after the construction of Ptolemy's canal, Cleopatra seems to have had no west–east waterway passage, because the Pelusiac branch of the Nile, which fed Ptolemy's west–east canal, had by that time dwindled, being choked with silt. In support of this contention one can note that in 31 BCE, during a reversal of fortune in Mark Antony's and Cleopatra's war against Octavian, she attempted to escape Egypt with her fleet by raising the ships out of the Mediterranean and dragging them across the isthmus of Suez to the Red Sea. Then, according to Plutarch, the Arabs of Petra attacked and burned the first wave of these ships and Cleopatra abandoned the effort. (Modern historians, however, maintain that her ships were burned by the enemy forces of Malichus I.)

Old Cairo to the Red Sea 
By the 8th century, a navigable canal existed between Old Cairo and the Red Sea, but accounts vary as to who ordered its construction – either Trajan or 'Amr ibn al-'As, or Umar. This canal was reportedly linked to the River Nile at Old Cairo and ended near modern Suez. A geography treatise De Mensura Orbis Terrae written by the Irish monk Dicuil (born late 8th century) reports a conversation with another monk, Fidelis, who had sailed on the canal from the Nile to the Red Sea during a pilgrimage to the Holy Land in the first half of the 8th century

The Abbasid Caliph al-Mansur is said to have ordered this canal closed in 767 to prevent supplies from reaching Arabian detractors.

Repair by al-Hakim 
Al-Hakim bi-Amr Allah is claimed to have repaired the Cairo to Red Sea passageway, but only briefly, circa 1000 CE, as it soon "became choked with sand". However, parts of this canal still continued to fill in during the Nile's annual inundations.

Conception by Venice 
The successful 1488 navigation of southern Africa by Bartolomeu Dias opened a direct maritime trading route to India and the Spice Islands, and forever changed the balance of Mediterranean trade. One of the most prominent losers in the new order, as former middlemen, was the former spice trading center of Venice.

Despite entering negotiations with Egypt's ruling Mamelukes, the Venetian plan to build the canal was quickly put to rest by the Ottoman conquest of Egypt in 1517, led by Sultan Selim I.

Ottoman attempts 
During the 16th century, the Ottoman Grand Vizier Sokollu Mehmed Pasha attempted to construct a canal connecting the Red Sea and the Mediterranean. This was motivated by a desire to connect Constantinople to the pilgrimage and trade routes of the Indian Ocean, as well as by strategic concerns—as the European presence in the Indian Ocean was growing, Ottoman mercantile and strategic interests were increasingly challenged, and the Sublime Porte was increasingly pressed to assert its position. A navigable canal would allow the Ottoman Navy to connect its Red Sea, Black Sea, and Mediterranean fleets. However, this project was deemed too expensive, and was never completed.

Napoleon's discovery of an ancient canal 
During the French campaign in Egypt and Syria in late 1798, Napoleon expressed interest in finding the remnants of an ancient waterway passage. This culminated in a cadre of archaeologists, scientists, cartographers and engineers scouring northern Egypt. Their findings, recorded in the Description de l'Égypte, include detailed maps that depict the discovery of an ancient canal extending northward from the Red Sea and then westward toward the Nile.

Later, Napoleon, who became the French Emperor in 1804, contemplated the construction of a north–south canal to connect the Mediterranean with the Red Sea. But the plan was abandoned because it incorrectly concluded that the waterway would require locks to operate, the construction of which would be costly and time-consuming. The belief in the need for locks was based on the erroneous belief that the Red Sea was  higher than the Mediterranean. This was the result of using fragmentary survey measurements taken in wartime during Napoleon's Egyptian Expedition.

As late as 1861, the unnavigable ancient route discovered by Napoleon from Bubastis to the Red Sea still channelled water as far east as Kassassin.

History of the Suez Canal

Interim period 

Despite the construction challenges that could have been the result of the alleged difference in sea levels, the idea of finding a shorter route to the east remained alive. In 1830, General Francis Chesney submitted a report to the British government that stated that there was no difference in elevation and that the Suez Canal was feasible, but his report received no further attention. Lieutenant Waghorn established his "Overland Route", which transported post and passengers to India via Egypt.

Linant de Bellefonds, a French explorer of Egypt, became chief engineer of Egypt's Public Works. In addition to his normal duties, he surveyed the Isthmus of Suez and made plans for the Suez Canal. French Saint-Simonianists showed an interest in the canal and in 1833, Barthélemy Prosper Enfantin tried to draw Muhammad Ali's attention to the canal but was unsuccessful. Alois Negrelli, the Italian-Austrian railroad pioneer, became interested in the idea in 1836.

In 1846, Prosper Enfantin's Société d'Études du Canal de Suez invited a number of experts, among them Robert Stephenson, Negrelli and Paul-Adrien Bourdaloue to study the feasibility of the Suez Canal (with the assistance of Linant de Bellefonds). Bourdaloue's survey of the isthmus was the first generally accepted evidence that there was no practical difference in altitude between the two seas. Britain, however, feared that a canal open to everyone might interfere with its India trade and therefore preferred a connection by train from Alexandria via Cairo to Suez, which Stephenson eventually built.

Construction by the Suez Canal Company

Preparations (1854–1858)

In 1854 and 1856, Ferdinand de Lesseps obtained a concession from Sa'id Pasha, the Khedive of Egypt and Sudan, to create a company to construct a canal open to ships of all nations. The company was to operate the canal for 99 years from its opening. De Lesseps had used his friendly relationship with Sa'id, which he had developed while he was a French diplomat in the 1830s. As stipulated in the concessions, de Lesseps convened the International Commission for the piercing of the isthmus of Suez (Commission Internationale pour le percement de l'isthme de Suez) consisting of 13 experts from seven countries, among them John Robinson McClean, later President of the Institution of Civil Engineers in London, and again Negrelli, to examine the plans developed by Linant de Bellefonds, and to advise on the feasibility of and the best route for the canal. After surveys and analyses in Egypt and discussions in Paris on various aspects of the canal, where many of Negrelli's ideas prevailed, the commission produced a unanimous report in December 1856 containing a detailed description of the canal complete with plans and profiles. The Suez Canal Company (Compagnie universelle du canal maritime de Suez) came into being on 15 December 1858.

The British government had opposed the project from the outset to its completion. The British, who controlled both the Cape route and the Overland route to India and the Far East, favored the status quo, given that a canal might disrupt their commercial and maritime supremacy. Lord Palmerston, the project's most unwavering foe, confessed in the mid-1850s the real motive behind his opposition: that Britain's commercial and maritime relations would be overthrown by the opening of a new route, open to all nations, and thus deprive his country of its present exclusive advantages. As one of the diplomatic moves against the project when it nevertheless went ahead, it disapproved of the use of "forced labour" for construction of the canal. Involuntary labour on the project ceased, and the viceroy condemned the corvée, halting the project.

International opinion was initially skeptical, and shares of Suez Canal Company did not sell well overseas. Britain, Austria, and Russia did not buy a significant number of shares. With assistance from the Cattaui banking family, and their relationship with James de Rothschild of the French House of Rothschild bonds and shares were successfully promoted in France and other parts of Europe. All French shares were quickly sold in France. A contemporary British skeptic claimed "One thing is sure... our local merchant community doesn't pay practical attention at all to this grand work, and it is legitimate to doubt that the canal's receipts... could ever be sufficient to recover its maintenance fee. It will never become a large ship's accessible way in any case."

Construction (1859–1869)
Work started on the shore of the future Port Said on 25 April 1859.

The excavation took some 10 years, with forced labour (corvée) being employed until 1864 to dig out the canal. Some sources estimate that over 30,000 people were working on the canal at any given period, that more than 1.5 million people from various countries were employed, and that tens of thousands of labourers died, many of them from cholera and similar epidemics.

Estimates of the number of deaths vary widely with Gamal Abdel Nasser citing 120,000 deaths upon nationalisation of the canal in a 26 July 1956 speech and the company's chief medical officer reporting no higher than 2.49 deaths per thousand in 1866. Doubling these estimates with a generous assumption of 50,000 working staff per year over 11 years would put a conservative estimate at fewer than 3,000 deaths. More closely relying on the limited reported data of the time, the number would be fewer than 1,000.

Company Towns

From its inauguration, till 1925, the Suez Canal Company built a series of company towns along the canal to serve its operation. They included ports and their facilities as well as housing for employees segregated by race or nationality. These were Port Said (1869) and Port Fuad (1925) at the canal's northern entrance by the Mediterranenan, Ismailia (1862) near the middle and north of Lake Timsah, and Port Twefik (1867) at the canal's southern entrance on the Red Sea.

Inauguration (17 November 1869)

The canal opened under French control in November 1869. The opening ceremonies began at Port Said on the evening of 15 November, with illuminations, fireworks, and a banquet on the yacht of the Khedive Isma'il Pasha of Egypt and Sudan. The royal guests arrived the following morning: the Emperor Franz Joseph I, the French Empress Eugenie in the Imperial yacht L'Aigle, the Crown Prince of Prussia, and Prince Louis of Hesse. Other international guests included the American natural historian H. W. Harkness. In the afternoon there were blessings of the canal with both Muslim and Christian ceremonies, a temporary mosque and church having been built side by side on the beach. In the evening there were more illuminations and fireworks.

On the morning of 17 November, a procession of ships entered the canal, headed by the L'Aigle. Among the ships following was HMS Newport, captained by George Nares, which surveyed the canal on behalf of the Admiralty a few months later. The Newport was involved in an incident that demonstrated some of the problems with the canal. There were suggestions that the depth of parts of the canal at the time of the inauguration were not as great as promised, and that the deepest part of the channel was not always clear, leading to a risk of grounding. The French ship Péluse anchored close to the entrance, then swung around and grounded, the ship and its hawser blocking the way into the lake. The following ships had to anchor in the canal itself until the Péluse was hauled clear the next morning, making it difficult for them to join that night's celebration in Ismailia. Except for the Newport: Nares sent out a boat to carry out soundings, and was able to manoeuver around the Péluse to enter the lake and anchor there for the night.

Ismailia was the scene of more celebrations the following day, including a military "march past", illuminations and fireworks, and a ball at the Governor's Palace. The convoy set off again on the morning of 19 November, for the remainder of the trip to Suez. After Suez, many of the participants headed for Cairo, and then to the Pyramids, where a new road had been built for the occasion.

An Anchor Line ship, the S.S. Dido, became the first to pass through the Canal from South to North.

Initial difficulties (1869–1871)
Although numerous technical, political, and financial problems had been overcome, the final cost was more than double the original estimate.

The Khedive, in particular, was able to overcome initial reservations held by both British and French creditors by enlisting the help of the Sursock family, whose deep connections proved invaluable in securing much international support for the project.

After the opening, the Suez Canal Company was in financial difficulties. The remaining works were completed only in 1871, and traffic was below expectations in the first two years. De Lesseps therefore tried to increase revenues by interpreting the kind of net ton referred to in the second concession (tonneau de capacité) as meaning a ship's cargo capacity and not only the theoretical net tonnage of the "Moorsom System" introduced in Britain by the Merchant Shipping Act in 1854. The ensuing commercial and diplomatic activities resulted in the International Commission of Constantinople establishing a specific kind of net tonnage and settling the question of tariffs in its protocol of 18 December 1873. This was the origin of the Suez Canal Net Tonnage and the Suez Canal Special Tonnage Certificate, both of which are still in use today.

Growth and reorganisation 

The canal had an immediate and dramatic effect on world trade. Combined with the American transcontinental railroad completed six months earlier, it allowed the world to be circled in record time. It played an important role in increasing European colonization of Africa. The construction of the canal was one of the reasons for the Panic of 1873 in Great Britain, because goods from the Far East had, until then, been carried in sailing vessels around the Cape of Good Hope and stored in British warehouses. An inability to pay his bank debts led Said Pasha's successor, Isma'il Pasha, in 1875 to sell his 44% share in the canal for £4,000,000 ($19.2 million), equivalent to £432 million to £456 million ($540 million to $570 million) in 2019, to the government of the United Kingdom. French shareholders still held the majority. Local unrest caused the British to invade in 1882 and take full control, although nominally Egypt remained part of the Ottoman Empire. The British representative from 1883 to 1907 was Evelyn Baring, 1st Earl of Cromer, who reorganized and modernized the government and suppressed rebellions and corruption, thereby facilitating increased traffic on the canal.

The European Mediterranean countries in particular benefited economically from the Suez Canal, as they now had much faster connections to Asia and East Africa than the North and West European maritime trading nations such as Great Britain, the Netherlands or Germany. The biggest beneficiary in the Mediterranean was Austria-Hungary, which had participated in the planning and construction of the canal. The largest Austrian maritime trading company, Österreichischer Lloyd, experienced rapid expansion after the canal was completed, as did the port city of Trieste, then an Austrian possession. The company was a partner in the Compagnie Universelle du Canal de Suez, whose vice-president was the Lloyd co-founder Pasquale Revoltella.

In 1900, a dredging trial was held by the Suez Canal Company to determine which ship would assist in the widening and deepening of the canal. One of the ships trailed in the dredging was The Hercules, a ship owned by the Queensland Government in Australia. The Hercules dredged deposits of granite and limestone, but it was determined at the end of the trial that the Hercules would not be used for the dredging of the Suez Canal. The ship was then returned to Brisbane, Australia in January 1901. 

The Convention of Constantinople in 1888 declared the canal a neutral zone under the protection of the British, who had occupied Egypt and Sudan at the request of Khedive Tewfiq to suppress the Urabi Revolt against his rule. The revolt went on from 1879 to 1882. The British defended the strategically important passage against a major Ottoman attack in 1915, during the First World War. Under the Anglo-Egyptian Treaty of 1936, the UK retained control over the canal. With outbreak of World War II the canal was again strategically important; Italo-German attempts to capture it were repulsed during the North Africa Campaign, which ensured the canal remained closed to Axis shipping.

Suez Crisis 

In 1951 Egypt repudiated the 1936 treaty with Great Britain. In October 1954 the UK tentatively agreed to remove its troops from the Canal Zone. Because of Egyptian overtures towards the Soviet Union, both the United Kingdom and the United States withdrew their pledge to financially support construction of the Aswan Dam. Egyptian President Gamal Abdel Nasser responded by nationalising the canal on 26 July 1956 and transferring it to the Suez Canal Authority, intending to finance the dam project using revenue from the canal. On the same day that the canal was nationalised Nasser also closed the Straits of Tiran to all Israeli ships. This led to the Suez Crisis in which the UK, France, and Israel invaded Egypt. According to the pre-agreed war plans under the Protocol of Sèvres, Israel invaded the Sinai Peninsula on 29 October, forcing Egypt to engage them militarily, and allowing the Anglo-French partnership to declare the resultant fighting a threat to stability in the Middle East and enter the war – officially to separate the two forces but in reality to regain the Canal and bring down the Nasser government.

To save the British from what he thought was a disastrous action and to stop the war from a possible escalation, Canadian Secretary of State for External Affairs Lester B. Pearson proposed the creation of the first United Nations peacekeeping force to ensure access to the canal for all and an Israeli withdrawal from the Sinai Peninsula. On 4 November 1956, a majority at the United Nations voted for Pearson's peacekeeping resolution, which mandated the UN peacekeepers to stay in Sinai unless both Egypt and Israel agreed to their withdrawal. The United States backed this proposal by putting pressure on the British government through the selling of sterling, which would cause it to depreciate. Britain then called a ceasefire, and later agreed to withdraw its troops by the end of the year. Pearson was later awarded the Nobel Peace Prize. As a result of damage and ships sunk under orders from Nasser the canal was closed until April 1957, when it was cleared with UN assistance. A UN force (UNEF) was established to maintain the free navigability of the canal, and peace in the Sinai Peninsula.

Arab–Israeli wars of 1967 and 1973

Prior to the 1967 war, Egypt had repeatedly closed the canal to Israeli shipping as a defensive measure, refusing to open the canal in 1949 and during the 1956 Suez Crisis. Egypt did so despite UN Security Council resolutions from 1949 and 1951 urging it not to, claiming that hostilities had ended with the 1949 armistice agreement.

On 16 May 1967, when Nasser ordered the UNEF peacekeeping forces out of the Sinai Peninsula, including the Suez Canal area, Egyptian troops were sent into Sinai to take their place. Israel protested Nasser's order to close the Straits of Tiran to Israeli trade on 21 May, the same year. This halted Israeli shipping between the port of Eilat and the Red Sea.

After the 1967 Six-Day War, Israeli forces occupied the Sinai Peninsula, including the entire east bank of the Suez Canal. In the following years the tensions between Egypt and Israel intensified and from March 1969 until August 1970, a war of attrition took place as the then Egyptian president, Gamal Abdel Nasser, tried to retake the territories occupied by Israel during the conflict. The fighting ceased after the death of Nasser in 1970. After this conflict there were no changes in the distribution of territory, but the underlying tensions persisted.

Unwilling to allow the Israelis to use the canal, Egypt immediately imposed a blockade which closed the canal to all shipping immediately after the beginning of the Six-Day War. The canal remained blocked for eight years. There was no anticipation of this event and consequently fifteen cargo ships, known as the "Yellow Fleet", were trapped in the canal, and remained there until its reopening in 1975.

On 6 October 1973, during the Yom Kippur War, the canal was the scene of the Operation Badr, in which the Egyptian military crossed the Suez Canal into Israeli-occupied Sinai Peninsula. Much wreckage from this conflict remains visible along the canal's edges. Arab oil exporters, sympathetic to Egypt, pushed OPEC to raise the price of crude oil by around 17 percent and eventually imposed an embargo against the United States and other Israeli allies.

Mine clearing operations (1974–75)
After the Yom Kippur War, the United States initiated Operation Nimbus Moon. The amphibious assault ship USS Inchon (LPH-12) was sent to the Canal, carrying 12 RH-53D minesweeping helicopters of Helicopter Mine Countermeasures Squadron 12. These partly cleared the canal between May and December 1974. She was relieved by the LST USS Barnstable County (LST1197). The British Royal Navy initiated Operation Rheostat and Task Group 65.2 provided for Operation Rheostat One (six months in 1974), the minehunters HMS Maxton, HMS Bossington, and HMS Wilton, the Fleet Clearance Diving Team (FCDT) and HMS Abdiel, a practice minelayer/MCMV support ship; and for Operation Rheostat Two (six months in 1975) the minehunters HMS Hubberston and HMS Sheraton, and HMS Abdiel. When the Canal Clearance Operations were completed, the canal and its lakes were considered 99% clear of mines. The canal was then reopened by Egyptian President Anwar Sadat aboard an Egyptian destroyer, which led the first convoy northbound to Port Said in 1975, at his side stood the Iranian Crown Prince Reza Pahlavi.

UN presence
The UNEF mandate expired in 1979. Despite the efforts of the United States, Israel, Egypt, and others to obtain an extension of the UN role in observing the peace between Israel and Egypt, as called for under the Egypt–Israel peace treaty of 1979, the mandate could not be extended because of the veto by the Soviet Union in the UN Security Council, at the request of Syria. Accordingly, negotiations for a new observer force in the Sinai produced the Multinational Force and Observers (MFO), stationed in Sinai in 1981 in coordination with a phased Israeli withdrawal. The MFO remains active under agreements between the United States, Israel, Egypt, and other nations.

Bypass expansion 

The project was called the New Suez Canal, as it allows ships to transit the canal in both directions simultaneously. The project cost more than LE 59.4 billion (US$9 billion) and was completed within a year. Sisi declared the expanded channel open to business in a ceremony on 6 August 2015.

2021 obstruction

On 23 March 2021, at around 05:40 UTC (07:40 local time), the Suez Canal was blocked in both directions by the ultra-large Evergreen G-class container ship Ever Given. The ship, operated by Evergreen Marine, was en route from Malaysia to the Netherlands when it ran aground after strong winds allegedly blew the ship off course. Upon running aground, Ever Given turned sideways, completely blocking the canal. Although part of the length of the canal is paralleled by an older narrower channel which can be used to bypass obstructions, this incident occurred south of that area, in a section of the canal where there is only one channel.

When the incident began, many economists and trade experts commented on the effects of the obstruction if not resolved quickly, citing how important the Suez was to global trade; the incident was likely to drastically affect the global economy because of the trapped goods scheduled to go through the canal. Among those goods, oil shipments were the most affected in the immediate aftermath, due to a significant number still blocked with no other way to reach their destination. Referring to the European and American market, a few maritime experts have disputed the prediction of a drastic effect on trade, saying this "really isn’t a substantial transit route for crude" according to Marshall Steeves, energy markets analyst at IHS Markit, and "there are existing stocks" according to Camille Egloff of Boston Consulting Group and alternative sources of supply, noting that traffic only slowed down and that it might only have impacted sectors with existing shortages (such as the semiconductor industry). The International Chamber of Shipping (ICS) estimates that up to $3 billion worth of cargo passes through the Suez Canal every day.

It was said the blockage would have an impact on cargo schedules around the world. Shipping companies were also considering whether to divert their ships along the much longer route around the Cape of Good Hope. The first container ship to do so was Ever Givens sister ship, Ever Greet.

The ship was re-floated on 29 March. Within a few hours, cargo traffic resumed, slowly resolving the backlog of around 450 ships. The first ship to successfully pass through the canal after the Ever Given's recovery was the YM Wish, a Hong Kong-based cargo ship.

On 2 April 2021, Usama Rabie, chairman of the Suez Canal Authority of Egypt, said that the damage caused by the blockage of the canal could reach about $1 billion. Rabie also revealed that after the Suez Canal resumed navigation, as of noon on 31 March 285 cargo ships had passed through the canal smoothly. He said that the remaining 175 freighters waiting to pass through the canal would all pass by 2 April.

After the incident, the Egyptian government announced that they would be widening the narrower parts of the canal. On 9 September 2021, the canal was briefly blocked again by the MV Coral Crystal. However, this ship was freed within 15 minutes, presenting minimal disruption to other convoys.

Timeline 

 1798: Napoleon Bonaparte commanded an expedition to Egypt with the intent of having “the Isthmus of Suez cut through” and assuring “the free and exclusive possession of the Red Sea to the French Republic”.
 1799: Bonaparte ordered the first feasibility study of the isthmus of Suez, which was carried out by Jacques-Marie Lepère (1763-1841). see also Commission des Sciences et des Arts 
 1809: The findings of Lepère's survey, published in “Description de l’Égypte”, incorrectly reported an alleged 10-metre (32 feet 6 inches) difference in sea levels and a high cost, so the project was put on hold.
 1833: Saint Simonians popularized the idea of constructing the canal. Prosper Enfantin, the leader of a sect of Saint Simonians, met with Ferdinand de Lesseps to conduct further surveys for the Suez Canal project.
 1847: A second survey which included Robert Stephenson, Adrien Bourdaloue and Alois Negrelli, discovered that the first analysis was incorrect. It is possible to build a direct link between the Mediterranean Sea and the Red Sea.
 30 November 1854: The former French consul in Cairo, Ferdinand Marie de Lesseps, obtained the first license for construction through an Act of Concession from Egypt's new viceroy, Said Pasha.
 15 December 1858: De Lesseps established the international company "Compagnie Universelle du Canal Maritime de Suez"; initially the majority was controlled by French private holders.
 25 April 1859: Construction officially started, with 20,000 fellahin forced to work.
 17 November 1869: Official opening of the Suez Canal. Empress Eugénie of France attended the opening ceremony and celebrations.
 1873: The International Commission of Constantinople established the Suez Canal Net Ton and the Suez Canal Special Tonnage Certificate 
 1875: The British purchase nearly half of the Suez Canal company's stock.
 1882: British military forces invaded Egypt. The canal was still managed by the privately owned Suez Canal Company.
 29 October 1888: The Convention of Constantinople was signed. Its main purpose was to guarantee free passage to merchant ships and regulate the transit of military warships.
 26 January to 4 February 1915: the Raid on the Suez Canal occurred as the Ottoman Army attacked the Suez Canal which was under the protectorate of the British Empire.
 14 November 1936: Following a new treaty, Britain pulled out of Egypt, but established the 'Suez Canal Zone' under its control.
 10 January 1950: Passenger tariffs are abolished.
 13 June 1956: Suez Canal Zone was restored to Egyptian sovereignty, following British withdrawal of about 90,000 troops and years of negotiations.
 26 July 1956: the Egypt president Nasser nationalised the Canal, previously under the control of a Franco-British company. 
 29 October 1956: Israel proceeded with the invasion of the Egyptian portion of the Sinai, marking the beginning of the Suez Crisis.
 31 October 1956 to 24 April 1957: the canal was blocked to shipping as a consequence of the Suez Crisis, a conflict that led to an Israeli, French, and British occupation of the canal zone. 
 29 November 1956: Tripartite invasion is ended, the canal zone was restored to Egyptian control, following French and British withdrawal, and the landing of UNEF troops. 
 5 June 1967 to 10 June 1975: The canal was blocked by Egypt, following the war with Israel; it became the front line during the ensuing War of Attrition and the 1973 war, remaining closed to international shipping, until general agreement was reached. 
 10 June 1967: Six Day War ends with the Israeli's capture of the Sinai.
 March 1969 to August 1970: War of Attrition between Egypt and Israel ended in a draw.
 6 October 1973: Operation Badr took place; Egyptian and Syrian armies crossed the canal and occupied part of the Sinai under Israel's control.
 10 June 1975: The Suez Canal is re-opened for first time since the Arab-Israeli 1967 war.
 2004: The canal was closed for three days when the oil tanker Tropic Brilliance became stuck.
 1 January 2008: New rules of navigation passed by the Suez Canal Authority came into force together with an increase of fees for transit of about 7.1%.
 6 August 2015: The new canal extensions were opened which consisted in a deepening of the main Canal as well as a 35 km-wide side Canal.
 18 October 2017: OOCL Japan ran aground causing an obstruction which blocked the canal for a few hours.
 23 to 29 March 2021: Ever Given, a Panama-flagged container ship, ran aground and became stuck across the southern section of the canal. The blockage prevented movement through the canal, caused nearly $10 billion worth of disruptions in shipping traffic each day, and created a large traffic jam of ships on both sides.

Layout and operation 

Capacity 
The canal can handle more traffic and larger ships than the Panama Canal, as Suezmax dimensions are greater than both Panamax and New Panamax. Some supertankers are too large to traverse the canal. Others can offload part of their cargo onto a canal-owned ship to reduce their draft, transit, and reload at the other end of the canal. On 15 April 2021 Egyptian authorities announced that they would widen the southern section of the Suez Canal to improve the efficiency of the canal.

Navigation 
Ships approaching the canal from the sea are expected to radio the harbour when they are within  of the Fairway Buoy near Port Said.
The canal has no locks because of the flat terrain, and the minor sea level difference between each end is inconsequential for shipping. As the canal has no sea surge gates, the ports at the ends would be subject to the sudden impact of tsunamis from the Mediterranean Sea and Red Sea, according to a 2012 article in the Journal of Coastal Research.

There is one shipping lane with passing areas in Ballah-Bypass near El Qantara and in the Great Bitter Lake. On a typical day, three convoys transit the canal, two southbound and one northbound. The low speed helps prevent erosion of the banks by ships' wakes.

By 1955, about two-thirds of Europe's oil passed through the canal. Around 8% of world sea trade is carried via the canal. In 2008, 21,415 vessels passed through the canal and the receipts totalled $5.381 billion, with an average cost per ship of $251,000.

New Rules of Navigation came into force on 1 January 2008, passed by the board of directors of the Suez Canal Authority (SCA) to organise vessels' transit. The amendments allow vessels loaded with dangerous cargo (such as radioactive or flammable materials) to pass if they conform with the latest amendments provided by international conventions.

The SCA has the right to determine the number of tugs required to assist warships traversing the canal, to achieve the highest degree of safety during transit.

Operation 
Before August 2015, the canal was too narrow for free two-way traffic, so ships had to pass in convoys and use bypasses. From north to south, they are Port Said bypass (entrances) , Ballah bypass & anchorage , Timsah bypass , and the Deversoir bypass (northern end of the Great Bitter Lake) . The bypasses were completed in 1980.

Typically, it would take a ship 12 to 16 hours to transit the canal. The canal's 24-hour capacity was about 76 standard ships.

In August 2014, Egypt chose a consortium that includes the Egyptian army and global engineering firm Dar Al-Handasah to develop an international industrial and logistics hub in the Suez Canal area, and began the construction of a new canal section from  combined with expansion and deep digging of the other  of the canal. This will allow navigation in both directions simultaneously in the  central section of the canal. These extensions were formally opened on 6 August 2015 by President Al-Sisi.

Convoy sailing 
Since the canal does not cater to unregulated two-way traffic, all ships transit in convoys on regular times, scheduled on a 24-hour basis. Each day, a single northbound convoy starts at 04:00 from Suez. At dual lane sections, the convoy uses the eastern route. Synchronised with this convoy's passage is the southbound convoy. It starts at 03:30 from Port Said and so passes the Northbound convoy in the two-lane section.

Canal crossings 

From north to south, the crossings are:
 The El Nasr pontoon bridge, connecting Port Said to Port Fuad. Opened in 2016,  length.
 The Suez Canal Bridge, also called the Egyptian-Japanese Friendship Bridge, a high-level road bridge at El Qantara. In Arabic, al qantara means "arch". Opened in 2001, it has a  clearance over the canal and was built with assistance from the Japanese government and by Kajima.
The previous bridge was destroyed in 1967 during the Arab-Israeli conflict. The current bridge is no longer functional due to the expansion of the Suez Canal, as the parallel shipping lane completed in 2015 just east of the bridge lacks a structure spanning it.
 The Ahmed el-Mansy pontoon bridge, a pair of pontoons bridging both channels
 The Taha Zaki Abdullah pontoon bridge, a pair of pontoons bridging both channels
 Ahmed Hamdi Tunnel south of the Great Bitter Lake was built in 1983. Because of leakage problems, a new water-tight tunnel was built inside the old one from 1992 to 1995.
 The Ahmed Omar Shabrawy pontoon bridge
 The Suez Canal overhead powerline crossing was built in 1999.

A railway on the west bank runs parallel to the canal for its entire length.

The five pontoon bridges were opened between 2016 and 2019. They are designed to be movable, and can be completely rotated against the banks of the canal to allow shipping through, or else individual sections can be moved to create a narrower channel.

Six new tunnels for cars and trains are also planned across the canal. Currently the Ahmed Hamdi is the only tunnel connecting Suez to the Sinai.

Economic impact 

Economically, after its completion, the Suez Canal benefited primarily the sea trading powers of the Mediterranean countries, which now had much faster connections to the Near and Far East than the North and West European sea trading nations such as Great Britain or Germany. The main Habsburg trading port of Trieste with its direct connections to Central Europe experienced a meteoric rise at that time.

The time saved in the 19th century for an assumed steamship trip to Bombay from Brindisi and Trieste was 37 days, from Genoa 32, from Marseille 31, from Bordeaux, Liverpool, London, Amsterdam and Hamburg 24 days. At that time, it was also necessary to consider whether the goods to be transported could bear the costly canal tariff. This led to a rapid growth of Mediterranean ports with their land routes to Central and Eastern Europe. As a result, liner services between Asia and Europe save 44 percent CO2 (carbon dioxide) thanks to this shorter route. The Suez Canal has a correspondingly important role in the connection between East Africa and the Mediterranean region.

In the 20th century, trade through the Suez Canal came to a standstill several times, due to the two world wars and the Suez Canal crisis. Many trade flows were also shifted away from the Mediterranean ports towards Northern European terminals, such as Hamburg and Rotterdam. Only after the end of the Cold War, the growth in European economic integration, the consideration of CO2 emission and the Chinese Silk Road Initiative, are Mediterranean ports such as Piraeus and Trieste again at the focus of growth and investment.

Alternative routes 
Before the canal's opening in 1869, goods were sometimes offloaded from ships and carried overland between the Mediterranean and the Red Sea.

Cape Agulhas 
The main alternative is around Cape Agulhas, the southernmost point of Africa, commonly referred to as the Cape of Good Hope route. This was the only sea route before the canal was constructed, and when the canal was closed. It is still the only route for ships that are too large for the canal. In the early 21st century, the Suez Canal has suffered from diminished traffic due to piracy in Somalia, with many shipping companies choosing to take the long route instead. Between 2008 and 2010, it is estimated that the canal lost 10% of traffic due to the threat of piracy, and another 10% due to the financial crisis. An oil tanker going from Saudi Arabia to the United States has  farther to go when taking the route south of Africa rather than the canal.

Northern Sea Route 

In recent years, the shrinking Arctic sea ice has made the Northern Sea Route feasible for commercial cargo ships between Europe and East Asia during a six-to-eight-week window in the summer months, shortening the voyage by thousands of kilometres compared to that through the Suez Canal. According to polar climate researchers, as the extent of the Arctic summer ice pack recedes the route will become passable without the help of icebreakers for a greater period each summer.

Cape Horn 
Sailing ships, such as the windjammers in the heyday of the Great Grain Race between Australia and Europe during the 1930s, often preferred the Cape Horn route when going to Europe, due to prevalent wind directions, even though it is slightly longer from Sydney to Europe this way than past Cape Agulhas.

Negev desert railway 
In February 2012, Israel announced its intention to construct a railway between the Mediterranean and Eilat through the Negev desert to compete with the canal. By 2019, the project had been indefinitely frozen.

Environmental impact 

The opening of the canal created the first salt-water passage between the Mediterranean Sea and the Red Sea. Although the Red Sea is about  higher than the eastern Mediterranean, the current between the Mediterranean and the middle of the canal at the Bitter Lakes flows north in winter and south in summer. The current south of the Bitter Lakes is tidal, varying with the tide at Suez. The Bitter Lakes, which were hypersaline natural lakes, blocked the migration of Red Sea species into the Mediterranean for many decades, but as the salinity of the lakes gradually equalised with that of the Red Sea the barrier to migration was removed, and plants and animals from the Red Sea have begun to colonise the eastern Mediterranean.

The Red Sea is generally saltier and less nutrient-rich than the Mediterranean, so that Erythrean species will often do well in the 'milder' eastern Mediterranean environment. To the contrary very few Mediterranean species have been able to settle in the 'harsher' conditions of the Red Sea. The dominant, south to north, migratory passage across the canal is often called Lessepsian migration (after Ferdinand de Lesseps) or "Erythrean invasion".  The recent construction by the Egyptian government of a major canal extension - allowing for two-way traffic in the central section of the canal and finally implemented in 2015 - raised concerns from marine biologists, who fear that it will enhance the arrival of Red Sea species in the Mediterranean.

Exotic species from the Indo-Pacific Ocean and introduced into the Mediterranean via the canal since the 1880s have become a significant component of the Mediterranean ecosystem. They already impact its ecology, endangering some local and endemic species. Since the piercing of the canal, over a thousand species from the Red Sea -  plankton, seaweeds, invertebrates, fishes - have been recorded in the Mediterranean, and many others will clearly follow. The resulting change in biodiversity is without precedent in human memory and is accelerating: a long-term cross-Basin survey engaged by the Mediterranean Science Commission recently documented that in the first twenty years of this century more exotic fish species from the Indian Ocean had reached the Mediterranean than during the entire 20th century. 

Historically, the construction of the canal was preceded by cutting a small fresh-water canal called Sweet Water Canal from the Nile delta along Wadi Tumilat to the future canal, with a southern branch to Suez and a northern branch to Port Said. Completed in 1863, these brought fresh water to a previously arid area, initially for canal construction, and subsequently facilitating growth of agriculture and settlements along the canal.  However the Aswan High Dam construction across the Nile, which started operating in 1968, much reduced the inflow of freshwater and cut all natural nutrient-rich silt entering the eastern Mediterranean at the Nile Delta.

Suez Canal Economic Zone 

The Suez Canal Economic Zone, sometimes shortened to SCZONE, describes the set of locations neighbouring the canal where customs rates have been reduced to zero in order to attract investment. The zone comprises over  within the governorates of Port Said, Ismailia and Suez. Projects in the zone are collectively described as the Suez Canal Area Development Project (SCADP).

The plan focuses on development of East Port Said and the port of Ain Sokhna, and hopes to extend to four more ports at West Port Said, El-Adabiya, Arish and El Tor.

The zone incorporates the four "Qualifying Industrial Zones" at Port Said, Ismailia and Suez, a 1996 American initiative to encourage economic ties between Israel and its neighbours.

See also 
 Belt and Road Initiative
 Canal des Deux Mers
 Container transport
 Corinth Canal
 Istanbul Canal
 Maritime Silk Road
 Mediterranean–Dead Sea Canal
 New Imperialism
 New Suez Canal
 Panama Canal
 Red Sea–Dead Sea Water Conveyance
 21st Century Maritime Silk Road
 Yellow Fleet

References

References 

 Britannica (2007) "Suez Canal", in: The new Encyclopædia Britannica, 15th ed., 28, Chicago, Ill.; London : Encyclopædia Britannica, 
 Farnie, D.A. East and West of Suez: Suez Canal in History, 1854–1956, a stanmdard scholarly history; 870 pp
 Galil, B.S. and Zenetos, A. (2002). "A sea change: exotics in the eastern Mediterranean Sea", in: Leppäkoski, E., Gollasch, S. and Olenin, S. (eds), Invasive aquatic species of Europe : distribution, impacts, and management, Dordrecht; Boston : Kluwer Academic, pp. 325–336
 Garrison, Ervan G. (1999) A history of engineering and technology : artful methods, 2nd ed., Boca Raton, Fla.; London : CRC Press, 
 Hallberg, Charles W. The Suez Canal: Its History and Diplomatic Importance (1931), a standard scholarly history; 440 pp; online 
 Karabell, Zachary (2003) Parting the Desert: The Creation of the Suez Canal, Knopf, 
 Oster, Uwe (2006) Le fabuleux destin des inventions : le canal de Suez, TV documentary produced by ZDF and directed by Axel Engstfeld (Germany)
 
 Sanford, Eva Matthews (1938) The Mediterranean world in ancient times, Ronald series in history, New York : The Ronald Press Company, 618 p.
 Pudney, John. Suez; De Lesseps' Canal. New York: Praeger, 1969.

External links 

 Suez Canal Authority
 Darius the Great's Suez Inscriptions
 Suez Canal on OpenStreetMap
 Encyclopedia of the Orient: Suez Canal 
 Entrance of the Suez Canal1882
 Suez Canal Container Terminal at Port Said
 Bibliography on Water Resources and International Law Peace Palace Library
 , including the new section
 American Society of Civil Engineers – Suez Canal
 Suez Canal map by Strommer, 19th century. Eran Laor Cartographic Collection, The National Library of Israel. Historic Cities Research Project.
 Images of container ship Ever Given aground in Suez Canal BBC News
Explained: The Whole Scenario Of Suez Canal. How Would It Have Impacted The Trade If It Persisted Longer? – Inventiva

 
Canals in Egypt
Ship canals
1860s in Egypt
Canals opened in 1869
Cuts (earthmoving)
Macro-engineering
Economy of Egypt
Egypt–United Kingdom relations
Geography of Egypt
Red Sea
1869 establishments in Egypt
N M Rothschild & Sons
Wadi Tumilat